Cajobi is a municipality in the state of São Paulo, Brazil. The population is 10,596 (2020 est.) in an area of 176.9 km². Cajobi belongs to the Mesoregion of São José do Rio Preto.

References

Municipalities in São Paulo (state)